The Desert Sun is a local daily newspaper serving Palm Springs and the surrounding Coachella Valley in Southern California.

History
The Desert Sun is owned by Gannett publications since 1988 and acquired the Indio Daily News in 1990 to become the sole local newspaper.

First issued on August 5, 1927, as a weekly six-page newspaper, The Desert Sun grew with the desert communities it serves. It covers local, state, national and world news, and has developed a variety of sections over time.

The newspaper began to publish six days a week in 1955 and had its first Sunday edition on September 8, 1991. Its circulation to date is 50,000 and their distribution range is in regional communities from Beaumont to Twentynine Palms to the Salton Sea.

The Desert Suns headquarters are in Palm Springs, in an office complex built in 1991 to replace a smaller building.

The Desert Sun publishes the Desert Post Weekly, a variety entertainment paper available on every Thursday in the distribution range, as well as city-specific publications The Indio Sun, The La Quinta Sun, The Palm Springs Weekend, The Palm Desert Sun and The Cathedral City Sun.

In 2010, the second page of the primary section is known as "7 by 7:30AM", to focus on the editor's selected seven most important stories of the day. The namesake was to estimate how long it takes to read the second page in half an hour (from 7:00 am to 7:30 am).

Greg Burton served as executive editor of the paper from 2011–2018, before leaving to become executive editor of The Arizona Republic. As of October 8, 2018, the executive editor became Julie Makinen. Makinen previously worked for The Washington Post, International New York Times, and Los Angeles Times, where she served as film editor and Beijing Bureau chief.

On Sunday, September 20, 2020, The Desert Sun ran its printing presses for the final time. Print editions of The Desert Sun are now printed in Phoenix at Gannett's co-owned Arizona Republic. 

In the 2010s, the Sun published a Spanish-Language weekly El Sol Desierto based in Coachella, California for its Hispanic/Latino readers.

Its main regional competitor is the Riverside Press-Enterprise based in Riverside, California.

See also

 Desert Star Weekly (published in Desert Hot Springs), a weekly Coachella Valley newspaper
 Desert Magazine (published in Palm Desert), a monthly magazine covering desert topics
 Desert Daily Guide Magazine (published in Palm Springs), a weekly magazine covering LGBT topics for 22 years

References

Further reading

External links

 Gannett subsidiary profile of The Desert Sun

Daily newspapers published in California
Mass media in Riverside County, California
Palm Springs, California
Indio, California
Coachella Valley
Gannett publications
Publications established in 1927